The Minsk agreements were a series of international agreements which sought to end the Donbas war fought between armed Russian separatist groups and Armed Forces of Ukraine, with Russian regular forces playing a central part. The first, known as the Minsk Protocol, was drafted in 2014 by the Trilateral Contact Group on Ukraine, consisting of Ukraine, Russia, and the Organization for Security and Co-operation in Europe (OSCE), with mediation by the leaders of France and Germany in the so-called Normandy Format. After extensive talks in Minsk, Belarus, the agreement was signed on 5 September 2014 by representatives of the Trilateral Contact Group and, without recognition of their status, by the then-leaders of the self-proclaimed Donetsk People's Republic (DPR) and Luhansk People's Republic (LPR). This agreement followed multiple previous attempts to stop the fighting in the region and aimed to implement an immediate ceasefire.

The agreement failed to stop fighting, and was thus followed with a revised and updated agreement, Minsk II, which was signed on 12 February 2015. This agreement consisted of a package of measures, including a ceasefire, withdrawal of heavy weapons from the front line, release of prisoners of war, constitutional reform in Ukraine granting self-government to certain areas of Donbas and restoring control of the state border to the Ukrainian government. While fighting subsided following the agreement's signing, it never ended completely, and the agreement's provisions were never fully implemented.

Amid rising tensions between Russia and Ukraine in early 2022, Russia officially recognised the DPR and LPR on 21 February 2022. Following that decision, on 22 February 2022, Russian President Vladimir Putin declared that the Minsk agreements "no longer existed", and that Ukraine, not Russia, was to blame for their collapse. Russia then invaded Ukraine on 24 February 2022.

Minsk Protocol

The Minsk Protocol was drawn up by the Trilateral Contact Group on Ukraine, which consisted of representatives from Ukraine, Russia, and the OSCE. The group was established in June 2014 as a way to facilitate dialogue and resolution of the strife across eastern and southern Ukraine. Meetings of the group, along with informal representatives of the breakaway Donetsk and Luhansk People's Republics, took place on 31 July, 26 August, 1 September, and 5 September 2014. The details of the agreement, signed on 5 September 2014, largely resembled Ukrainian president Petro Poroshenko's 20 June "fifteen-point peace plan".

Text of the protocol
The text of the protocol consists of twelve points:

 To ensure an immediate bilateral ceasefire.
 To ensure the monitoring and verification of the ceasefire by the OSCE.
 Decentralisation of power, including through the adoption of the Ukrainian law "On temporary Order of Local Self-Governance in Particular Districts of Donetsk and Luhansk Oblasts".
 To ensure the permanent monitoring of the Ukrainian-Russian border and verification by the OSCE with the creation of security zones in the border regions of Ukraine and the Russian Federation.
 Immediate release of all hostages and illegally detained persons.
 A law preventing the prosecution and punishment of people in connection with the events that have taken place in some areas of Donetsk and Luhansk Oblasts.
 To continue the inclusive national dialogue.
 To take measures to improve the humanitarian situation in Donbas.
 To ensure early local elections in accordance with the Ukrainian law "On temporary Order of Local Self-Governance in Particular Districts of Donetsk and Luhansk Oblasts".
 To withdraw illegal armed groups and military equipment as well as fighters and mercenaries from the territory of Ukraine.
 To adopt a programme of economic recovery and reconstruction for the Donbas region.
 To provide personal security for participants in the consultations.

Signatories
The following representatives signed the document:
Swiss diplomat and OSCE representative Heidi Tagliavini
Former president of Ukraine (July 1994 to January 2005) and Ukrainian representative Leonid Kuchma
Russian Ambassador to Ukraine and Russian representative Mikhail Zurabov
Rebel heads Alexander Zakharchenko and Igor Plotnitsky

Follow-up memorandum
In the two weeks after the Minsk Protocol was signed, there were frequent violations of the ceasefire by both parties to the conflict. Talks continued in Minsk, and a follow-up to the Minsk Protocol was agreed to on 19 September 2014. This memorandum clarified the implementation of the Protocol. Amongst some of the peacemaking measures agreed to were:

 To ban flights by combat aircraft over the security zone
 To withdraw all foreign mercenaries from the conflict zone
 To ban offensive operations
 To pull heavy weaponry  back on each side of the line of contact, creating a  buffer zone
 To task the OSCE Special Monitoring Mission to Ukraine with monitoring implementation of Minsk Protocol

Efficacy
After the follow-up memorandum, the Second Battle of Donetsk Airport broke out, and both parties continued to accuse each other of ceasefire violations. In late October, DPR prime minister and Minsk Protocol signatory Alexander Zakharchenko said that his forces would retake the territory they had lost to Ukrainian forces during a July 2014 offensive, and that DPR forces would be willing to wage "heavy battles" to do so. Subsequently, Zakharchenko said that he had been misquoted, and that he had meant to say that these areas would be taken through "peaceful means".

While campaigning in the lead-up to the 2 November elections held by the DPR and LPR in violation of the Protocol, Zakharchenko said "These are historical times. We are creating a new country! It's an insane goal". OSCE chairman Didier Burkhalter confirmed that the elections ran "counter to the letter and spirit of the Minsk Protocol", and said that they would "further complicate its implementation".

Speaking on 5 December, Russian foreign minister Sergey Lavrov said that the 2 November DPR and LPR elections were "exactly within the range in which they had been negotiated in Minsk", and that the Ukrainian parliament was supposed to pass an amnesty bill for DPR and LPR leaders after the Ukrainian parliamentary election in late October. According to Lavrov, closer monitoring of the Russo-Ukrainian border, as specified by the Minsk Protocol, could only take place after such an amnesty law was approved. He noted that he thought that a Ukrainian presidential decree banning prosecution of Donbas separatist combatants was issued on 16 September, but said that "a bill has now been filed proposing to overturn" the decree.

Collapse
By January 2015, the Minsk Protocol ceasefire had completely collapsed. Following the separatist victory at Donetsk International Airport in defiance of the Protocol, DPR spokesman Eduard Basurin said that "the Minsk Memorandum will not be considered in the form it was adopted". Later in the day, DPR leader Alexander Zakharchenko said that the DPR "will not make any attempts at ceasefire talks any more", and that his forces were going to "attack right up to the borders of Donetsk region". The New York Times said that the ceasefire had "all but vanished".

Amidst increasing violence in the combat zone, another round of Minsk talks was scheduled for 31 January. Members of the Trilateral Contact Group travelled to Minsk to meet representatives of the DPR and LPR. The DPR and LPR signatories of the Protocol did not attend, and those representatives that did attend were not able to discuss the implementation of the Protocol or memorandum. These representatives asked for the revision of the Protocol and the memorandum. The meeting was adjourned with no result.

Minsk II, February 2015

Successive attempts to resolve the ongoing war in the Donbas region of Ukraine had seen no result by the start of February 2015. While the Minsk Protocol of 5 September 2014 did significantly reduce fighting in the conflict zone for many months, minor skirmishes continued. At the start of January 2015, the separatist forces of the Donetsk People's Republic (DPR) and Luhansk People's Republic (LPR) began a new offensive on Ukrainian-controlled areas, resulting in the complete collapse of the Minsk Protocol ceasefire.

After heavy fighting, DPR forces captured the symbolically important Donetsk International Airport on 21 January, the last part of the city of Donetsk that had been under Ukrainian control. Following this victory, separatist forces pressed their offensive on the important railway and road junction of Debaltseve in late January. This renewed heavy fighting caused significant concern in the international community. French president François Hollande and German chancellor Angela Merkel put forth a new peace plan on 7 February.

The Franco-German plan, drawn up after talks with Ukrainian president Petro Poroshenko and Russian president Vladimir Putin, was seen as a revival of the Minsk Protocol. President Hollande said that the plan was the "last chance" for resolution of the conflict. The plan was put forth in response to American proposals to send armaments to the Ukrainian government, something that Chancellor Merkel said would only result in a worsening of the crisis.

A summit to discuss the implementation of the Franco-German diplomatic plan was scheduled for 11 February at the Independence Palace in Minsk, the capital of Belarus. It was attended by Russian president Vladimir Putin, Ukrainian president Petro Poroshenko, German chancellor Angela Merkel, French president François Hollande, DPR leader Alexander Zakharchenko, and LPR leader Igor Plotnitsky. Negotiations went on overnight for sixteen hours, and were said to have been "very difficult" by the German foreign minister.

Following the talks, it was announced on 12 February 2015 that the parties to the conflict had agreed to a new package of peacemaking measures, the Package of Measures for the Implementation of the Minsk Agreements, which is commonly called Minsk II. Some of the measures agreed to were an OSCE-observed unconditional ceasefire from 15 February, withdrawal of heavy weapons from the front line, release of prisoners of war, and constitutional reform in Ukraine.

Text of the agreement
The full text of the agreement is as follows:

 Immediate and full ceasefire in particular districts of Donetsk and Luhansk oblasts of Ukraine and its strict fulfilment as of 00:00 midnight EET on 15 February 2015.
 for Ukrainian troops, from actual line of contact;
 for armed formations of particular districts of Donetsk and Luhansk oblasts of Ukraine, from the contact line in accordance with the Minsk Memorandum as of 19 September 2014The pullout of the above-mentioned heavy weapons must start no later than the second day after the start of the ceasefire and finish within 14 days.This process will be assisted by OSCE with the support of the Trilateral Contact Group.
 Effective monitoring and verification of ceasefire regime and pullout of heavy weapons by OSCE will be provided from the first day of pullout, using all necessary technical means such as satellites, drones, radio-location systems etc.
 On the first day after the pullout a dialogue is to start on modalities of conducting local elections in accordance with the Ukrainian legislation and the Law of Ukraine "On temporary Order of Local Self-Governance in Particular Districts of Donetsk and Luhansk Oblasts," and also about the future of these districts based on the above-mentioned law.Without delays, but no later than 30 days from the date of signing of this document, a resolution has to be approved by the Verkhovna Rada of Ukraine, indicating the territory which falls under the special regime in accordance with the law "On temporary Order of Local Self-Governance in Particular Districts of Donetsk and Luhansk Oblasts," based in the line set up by the Minsk Memorandum as of 19 September 2014.
 Provide pardon and amnesty by way of enacting a law that forbids persecution and punishment of persons in relation to events that took place in particular districts of Donetsk and Luhansk oblasts of Ukraine.
 Provide release and exchange of all hostages and illegally held persons, based on the principle of "all for all". This process has to end – at the latest – on the fifth day after the pullout (of weapons).
 Provide safe access, delivery, storage and distribution of humanitarian aid to the needy, based on an international mechanism.
 Define the modalities of a full restoration of social and economic connections, including social transfers, such as payments of pensions and other payments (income and revenue, timely payment of communal bills, restoration of tax payments within the framework of Ukrainian legal field).With this aim, Ukraine will restore management over the segment of its banking system in the districts affected by the conflict, and possibly, an international mechanism will be established to ease such transactions.
 Restore control of the state border to the Ukrainian government in the whole conflict zone, which has to start on the first day after the local election and end after the full political regulation (local elections in particular districts of Donetsk and Luhansk oblasts based on the law of Ukraine and Constitutional reform) by the end of 2015, on the condition of fulfilment of Point 11 – in consultations and in agreement with representatives of particular districts of Donetsk and Luhansk oblasts within the framework of the Trilateral Contact Group.
 Pullout of all foreign armed formations, military equipment, and also mercenaries from the territory of Ukraine under OSCE supervision. Disarmament of all illegal groups.
 Constitutional reform in Ukraine, with a new constitution to come into effect by the end of 2015, the key element of which is decentralisation (taking into account peculiarities of particular districts of Donetsk and Luhansk oblasts, agreed with representatives of these districts), and also approval of permanent legislation on the special status of particular districts of Donetsk and Luhansk oblasts in accordance with the measures spelt out in the attached footnote, by the end of 2015.
 Based on the Law of Ukraine "On temporary Order of Local Self-Governance in Particular Districts of Donetsk and Luhansk Oblasts", questions related to local elections will be discussed and agreed upon with representatives of particular districts of Donetsk and Luhansk oblasts in the framework of the Trilateral Contact Group. Elections will be held in accordance with relevant OSCE standards and monitored by OSCE/ODIHR.
 Intensify the work of the Trilateral Contact Group including through the establishment of working groups on the implementation of relevant aspects of the Minsk agreements. They will reflect the composition of the Trilateral Contact Group.

Signatories
The document was signed by:
Separatist's leaders Alexander Zakharchenko and Igor Plotnitsky
Swiss diplomat and OSCE representative Heidi Tagliavini
Former president of Ukraine and Ukrainian representative Leonid Kuchma
Russian Ambassador to Ukraine and Russian representative Mikhail Zurabov

Reactions
The new package, commonly referred to as "Minsk II", was criticised for being "highly complicated" and "extremely fragile", and for being very similar to the failed Minsk Protocol. The New York Times reported that the plan had "included some tripwires", such as not demarcating control over the city of Debaltseve, which was the site of the most fierce fighting at the time of the plan's drafting. Following the Minsk talks, Chancellor Merkel, President Hollande, and President Poroshenko attended a European Union (EU) summit in Brussels.

At the summit, the Minsk participants briefed EU leaders about the talks. During the briefing, they said that President Putin had tried to delay the implementation of a ceasefire by ten days, so as to force Ukrainian troops in Debaltseve to surrender their positions. For his part, President Putin said that the Debaltseve defenders were encircled, and that the separatists expected them "to lay down their arms and cease resistance".

Kommersant reporter Andrey Kolesnikov wrote that implementation of the ceasefire in Debaltseve hinged upon whether or not Ukrainian forces were truly encircled, "Above all, does it exist or not? Vladimir Putin insisted that it [the encirclement] exists and that if a cease-fire agreement is reached, it will be odd if it isn't violated: Those in the kettle will certainly try to get out of there; those who have boiled that kettle will try to collect the foam".

US State Department spokeswoman Jen Psaki said on 13 February that the Russian Armed Forces had actively deployed around Debaltseve to assist the separatists in forcing out Ukrainian troops prior to the start of the ceasefire, the 15 February. Russia denied this, and Russian government spokesman Dmitry Peskov said that Russia could not assist in the implementation of Minsk II because it was "not a participant" in the conflict.

Right Sector leader Dmytro Yarosh said that he reserved the right to continue fighting, and that Minsk II was unconstitutional. He said that his Ukrainian Volunteer Corps would continue fighting "until complete liberation of Ukrainian lands from Russian occupants", and promised "death to Russian terrorist-occupiers". DPR leader Alexander Zakharchenko said that the ceasefire did not apply to Debaltseve, and that fighting would continue there.

Efficacy

Though the fighting generally subsided after the ceasefire came into effect at 0:00 EET on 15 February, skirmishes and shelling continued in several parts of the conflict zone. Shelling and fighting at Debaltseve continued, as DPR leader Alexander Zakharchenko said that the ceasefire did not apply to that area. In the south of Donetsk Oblast, fighting between DPR forces and members of the Azov Battalion continued in villages near Mariupol. By 16 February, Minsk II seemed on the verge of collapse. Separatists continued a heavy assault on Debaltseve. Both sides said that they would not withdraw heavy weaponry as specified by the agreement whilst fighting in Debaltseve was ongoing. Reuters described the ceasefire as "stillborn" in Debaltseve. Ukrainian forces were forced to retreat from Debaltseve on 18 February, leaving separatist forces in control of the city.

In the week after the fall of Debaltseve to pro-Russian forces, fighting in the conflict zone abated. DPR and LPR forces began to withdraw artillery from the front lines as specified by Minsk II on 24 February, and Ukraine did so on 26 February. Ukraine reported that it had suffered no casualties during 24–26 February, something that had not occurred since early January 2015.

The parliament of Ukraine approved a law on "special status" for Donbas on 17 March, as specified by Minsk II. Later, in 2019, Ukraine's parliament voted to extend regulations giving limited self-rule to separatist-controlled eastern regions, a prerequisite for a deal to settle the five-year conflict there. The law was immediately criticised by Ukrainian politicians, separatist leaders, and the Russian government. Radical Party leader Oleh Lyashko said that the law was "a vote for de facto recognition of the Russian occupation in Donbas". Vice-parliamentary speaker Andriy Parubiy said that law was "not for Putin or the occupiers", but to show Europe that Ukraine was willing to adhere to Minsk II. Russian foreign minister Sergei Lavrov said that the law was a "sharp departure from the Minsk agreements" because it demanded local elections under Ukrainian jurisdiction.

Representatives of the LPR and DPR said that the law was a "one-sided" modification of Minsk II, and that the agreement had been rendered void by this modification. DPR leader Alexander Zakharchenko said that any change to Minsk II that had not been mutually agreed upon was "legally void", and that "nothing that had been agreed upon in Minsk has been carried out". He added that the DPR "must occupy all of the cities in which the referendum took place, and then politically cooperate [with Ukraine] as equal partners". Despite this, representatives of the DPR and LPR continued to forward peace proposals to the Trilateral Contact Group on Ukraine.

Ukrainian defence minister Stepan Poltorak said on 8 June 2015 that over 100 soldiers and at least 50 civilians had been killed since Minsk II came into effect. According to him, pro-Russian forces had violated the truce more than 4,000 times. Contrary to the agreement, DPR representative Denis Pushilin and LPR representative Vladislav Deinego said on 10 June 2015 that their republics "would like to join the Russian Federation". In addition, they said that they consider Crimea, which was annexed by Russia in March 2014, to be part of Russia.

American Defense Department official Michael Carpenter said on 2 March 2016 that at least 430 Ukrainian soldiers had died since the signing of Minsk II, that Russia maintained "command-and-control links" over the DPR and LPR, and that Russia was "pouring heavy weapons" into the Donbas. Deputy head of the OSCE mission in Ukraine Alexander Hug said on 25 March 2016 that the OSCE had observed "armed people with Russian insignia" fighting in Donbas from the beginning of the conflict, that they had talked to prisoners who said they were Russian soldiers, and that they had seen "tire tracks, not the vehicles themselves, but the tracks of vehicles crossing the [Russo-Ukrainian] border".

Russian Foreign Ministry spokeswoman Maria Zakharova said on 27 March 2016 that Russia was "not a party to the Minsk agreements", and that the agreements were "devoted to two conflicting sides". The Parliamentary Assembly of the Organization for Security and Co-operation in Europe however claims that the Minsk Protocol also includes the liberation of those hostages who have been abducted from the Ukrainian territory and are illegally detained in Russia, e.g. Nadiya Savchenko and Oleg Sentsov.

On 27 December 2018, Ukrainian news agency UNIAN reported that not a single provision of the Minsk deal had been fully implemented.

In July 2020, Office of The President of Ukraine announced Leonid Kuchma will no longer take part in the work of the Trilateral Contact Group (TCG) on resolving the situation in Ukraine's east. Leonid Kuchma met with Ukrainian President Volodymyr Zelensky on 28 July.

In June 2021, U.S. President Joe Biden and Russian President Vladimir Putin "agreed to pursue diplomacy related to the Minsk agreement."

A Normandy Format meeting was planned between Russia, Ukraine, Germany and France in Paris on 26 January 2022. Ukraine fulfilled Russia's condition for a meeting in Paris and decided to withdraw from Parliament the controversial draft law on the reintegration of the Crimea and Donbas region, because the law was contrary to the Minsk II.

Elections in the DPR and LPR
While the 2015 Ukrainian local elections had been scheduled for 25 October, DPR leader Alexander Zakharchenko issued a decree on 2 July that ordered local DPR elections to be held on 18 October. He said that this action was "in accordance with the Minsk agreements". According to Zakharchenko, this move meant that the DPR had "independently started to implement the Minsk agreements". Zakharchenko said that the elections would "take place 'on the basis of Ukraine's law on temporary self-rule status of individual districts of the Donetsk and Luhansk regions', in so far as they are not at variance with the constitution and laws of the DPR".

On the same day, President Petro Poroshenko responded that if DPR elections went forward in this unilateral manner, it would be "extremely irresponsible and will have devastating consequences for the process of deescalation of tension in certain areas of Donetsk and Luhansk regions". In addition, the OSCE said that it would only send observers to elections in the conflict zone if Ukraine invited it to do so. As specified in Minsk II, local elections in DPR and LPR-held territories must be observed by the OSCE to be deemed legitimate. LPR leader Igor Plotnitsky followed the DPR by scheduling elections in the territory that he controlled for 1 November 2015.

Amidst a great reduction in violence, following an agreement to restart the implementation of Minsk II that was agreed to on 1 September, the Normandy four held a meeting on 2 October. At the meeting, it was agreed that elections in the conflict zone would be held in accordance with Minsk II. In order to do this, French President François Hollande said that the elections would need to be postponed until 2016, as three months were required to prepare for them. Russian President Vladimir Putin agreed to use his influence to prevent the DPR and LPR from holding early elections.

Accordingly, the DPR and LPR announced on 6 October that their planned elections had been postponed until 21 February 2016. Local elections in the rest of Ukraine went ahead on 25 October 2015. Following the postponement, German foreign minister Frank-Walter Steinmeier said that if OSCE observers verified that the planned elections to be held in the separatist areas were in accordance with Ukrainian law and Minsk II, the "law on special status" for these areas would come into immediate effect.

On 18 April 2016 the planned (organised by the DPR and LPR) local elections were postponed from 20 April to 24 July 2016. On 22 July 2016 these DPR and LPR elections were again postponed to 6 November 2016. On 2 October 2016 the DPR and LPR held "primaries" in which voters nominated candidates for the 6 November 2016 elections. Ukraine denounced these "primaries" as illegal. On 4 November 2016 both DPR and LPR postponed their local elections "until further notice"; head of the DPR Zakharchenko added that "In 2017, we will hold elections under the Minsk agreements, or we will hold them independently."

Elections for the People's Council of the Donetsk People's Republic and the People's Council of the Luhansk People's Republic were organised and held by the Donetsk and Luhansk People's Republics on 11 November 2018.

Evaluation and abandonment 
Following the fall of Debaltseve in February 2015, about one-third of the Donbas region remained in separatist control. A few days before the 2022 Russian invasion, French president Emmanuel Macron and US Secretary of State Antony Blinken opined that the Minsk agreements were "the way forward" to end the conflict in Donbas. Blinken added that it was an incomplete step as there were other outstanding issues. The aim of the Russian intervention in Donbas was to establish pro-Russian governments that, upon reincorporation into Ukraine, would facilitate Russian inference in Ukrainian politics. The agreements were thus highly favourable to the Russian side, as their implementation would accomplish these goals.

In May and June 2021, Mark Galeotti proposed "it is time to recognize that the Minsk process has run its course — and may if anything be blocking any more meaningful dialogue", and suggested that as an external party, the United Kingdom might move diplomacy forward. In a June 2021 interview, Vladislav Surkov, Putin's aide for Ukraine policy from 2013 to 2020, who was removed from his role in February 2020, said that Ukraine "can be reformed as a confederation, with a lot of freedom for the regions to decide things by themselves". He said the country would be severed by the "geopolitical gravity" between Russia and the West, describing the Minsk agreements as an act that "legitimized the first division of Ukraine" in a "reconquest", "the first open geopolitical counter-attack by Russia [against the West]". In October 2021, Russian Foreign Minister Sergey Lavrov said that "if the Americans are genuinely prepared to support the implementation of the Minsk Agreements, this issue can be settled very quickly."

A dispute emerged over the role of the Russian Federation, with the parties understanding Minsk as an agreement between Ukraine and Russia, but Russian officials claiming the role of mediator, insisted that Ukraine negotiate directly with representatives of the self-proclaimed separatist republics in parts of Donetsk and Luhansk. Ukrainian President Volodymyr Zelensky said he has "no intention of talking to terrorists". The Russian side refused high-level talks, and the Kremlin endorsed an October 2021 Kommersant article by former Russian president Dmitri Medvedev entitled "Why It Is Senseless to Deal with the Current Ukrainian Leadership", which some have criticized.

In November 2021, the Russian foreign ministry breached diplomatic protocol by releasing confidential correspondence with negotiators Germany and France.

In December 2021, Chief of General Staff of the Russian Armed Forces Valery Gerasimov said that "Kyiv is not fulfilling the Minsk Agreements. The Ukrainian armed forces are touting that they have started to employ US-supplied Javelin anti-tank missile systems in Donbas and are also using Turkish reconnaissance/strike drones. As a result, the already tense situation in the east of that country is further deteriorating."

In January 2022, Oleksiy Danilov, the secretary of Ukraine's National Security and Defense Council, said that "The fulfillment of the Minsk agreement means the country’s destruction. When they were signed under the Russian gun barrel — and the German and the French watched — it was already clear for all rational people that it’s impossible to implement those documents."

In February 2022, Finnish President Sauli Niinistö said "the most possible solution (to the current situation) could be the Minsk agreement to be fulfilled or that there would be significant progress in its implementation."

On 15 February 2022, the Russian Duma voted to appeal to President Putin to recognise the self-proclaimed LPR and DPR. The next day, a Russian government spokesman acknowledged that officially recognising the Donbas republics would not be in keeping with the Minsk agreements. However, he also told journalists that Putin's priority in regulating the situation in Donbas is the implementation of mechanisms adopted under those agreements. Russia went on to officially recognise the self-proclaimed Luhansk and Donetsk people's republics on 21 February 2022. Following that decision, on 22 February 2022, President Putin said that the Minsk agreements "no longer existed", and that Ukraine, not Russia, was to blame for their collapse, accusing Ukraine of genocide in Donbas in his comments – a statement largely seen as baseless and factually wrong by the wider world, academics studying genocide, and the United Nations. Russia then invaded Ukraine on 24 February 2022.

On 24 August 2022, after a meeting of the Crimea Platform, Ukrainian president Volodymyr Zelenskiy stated that current front lines in the war would not be frozen. "At the point where we are, we are not ready for a ceasefire. We explained that there will be no Minsk-3, Minsk-5, or Minsk-7. We will not play these games, we have lost part of our territories this way … it is a trap".

Angela Merkel said in 2022 that the agreement had been "an attempt to give Ukraine time" and that Ukraine used it to strengthen its armed forces.

See also

 Normandy Format
 OSCE Minsk Group, for resolving the Armenia–Azerbaijan conflict
 2021–2022 Russo-Ukrainian crisis
 Outline of the Russo-Ukrainian War

Notes

References

External links 

 Map: Plan for stabilization of the situation in south-eastern Ukraine (Ru.).
Text of the agreements, including English translations, at the United Nations:
Protocol on the results of consultations of the Trilateral Contact Group (Minsk Agreement)
Memorandum on the Implementation of the Provisions of the Protocol on the Outcome of Consultations of the Trilateral Contact Group on Joint Steps Aimed at the Implementation of the Peace Plan (Implementation of the Minsk Agreement)
Package of Measures for the Implementation of the Minsk Agreements
Scanned original Russian-language source documents, at the OSCE:
Minsk protocol: Протокол по итогам консультаций Трехсторонней контактной группы относительно совместных шагов, направленных на имплементацию Мирного плана Президента Украины П. Порошенко и инициатив Президента России В. Путина
Memorandum on the implementation: Меморандум об исполнении положений Протокола по итогам консультаций Трехсторонней контактной группы относительно шагов, направленных на имплементацию Мирного плана Президента Украины П. Порошенко и инициатив Президента России В. Путина
Package of measures: Комплекс мер по выполнению Минских соглашений

War in Donbas
2010s in Minsk
2014 in Belarus
2014 in Ukraine
Treaties of Ukraine
Donetsk People's Republic
Luhansk People's Republic
Treaties of Russia
Treaties concluded in 2014
Treaties entered into force in 2014
Russia–Ukraine relations
Organization for Security and Co-operation in Europe
Ceasefires
21st-century diplomatic conferences (Europe)
2022 endings
February 2014 events in Ukraine
February 2014 events in Europe